HMS Thetis was a 32-gun fifth-rate frigate of the Royal Navy, built by Wyatt & Co. at Buckler's Hard shipyard in 1773.

From 1777 to 1781 she served with the North American squadron.

Thetis took part in the action of 9 August 1780, when a convoy she was escorting fell prey to a Franco-Spanish squadron. 55 merchantmen were captured, but she managed to escape.

In 1780, she was wrecked.

Notes, citations, and references

Notes

Citations

References
 
 Michael Phillips' ships of the old Navy

Frigates of the Royal Navy
Ships built in Rotherhithe
1773 ships
Frigates of the French Navy
Captured ships